NGC 1317 (also known as NGC 1318) is a barred spiral galaxy in the constellation Fornax, in the Fornax cluster. It was discovered by Julius Schmidt on January 19, 1865. It appears to be interacting with the much larger NGC 1316, but uncertainty in distance estimates and scales of tidal distortions make this uncertain. It is a member of the NGC 1316 subgroup, part of the Fornax Cluster. Its size is 2.8' x 2.4' which, at the average distance, gives a diameter of 55,000 light-years.

Distance estimates 

NGC 1317 has an uncertain distance. Based on redshift, the distance is 55.1 million light-years, but some other methods estimate a distance as large as 88.4 million light-years. The distance of this galaxy is therefore somewhere between 55 and 88 Mly, but its true distance is unknown. The average distance between the two estimates is around 70 million light-years, which means NGC 1317 is also in the Fornax Cluster.

References

External links 
 

Fornax Cluster
1317
Fornax (constellation)
Barred spiral galaxies
012653